FC Desna-3 Chernihiv  is the reserve or third squad of Ukrainian football club Desna Chernihiv or Under 19, from the city of Chernihiv.

Stadium and facilities
The team of the Desna 3 play in the Olympic sports training center "Chernihiv" (formerly Stadion Yuriya Gagarina). The Stadion Yuri Gagarin in Chernihiv was built in 1936 for 3,000 spectators in eastern portion of a city park (garden) that exists since 1804 and where previously was located residence of the Chernihiv Archbishops. The team played in Tekstylschyk stadium in Lokomotiv stadium and in the Khimik Sport Complex. Recently the team has been transferred to play in the new modern Chernihiv Arena belong to the second main club FC Chernihiv of the city who plays in Ukrainian Second League.

Crest
The crest of the club, which was created in early 2008 contained an image of an eagle from the coat of arms of Chernihiv and a sign of Chernihiv prince Mstyslav Volodymyrovych.

Players

Current squad

Notable players

 Bohdan Lytvynenko
 Maksym Shumylo
 Pavlo Shostka
 Igor Samoylenko
 Renat Mochulyak
 Oleksandr Pyshchur
 Vladyslav Shkolnyi

Managers
 2008–2021 Serhiy Bakun
 2021 Oleksandr Zub

See also
 List of sport teams in Chernihiv
 FC Desna Chernihiv
 FC Desna-2 Chernihiv
 SDYuShOR Desna
 FC Chernihiv
 Yunist Chernihiv
 Lehenda Chernihiv
 Yunist ShVSM

External links
 Official Site of Desna
 Official Site of Desna 2

References

 
FC Desna Chernihiv
Football clubs in Chernihiv
Football clubs in Chernihiv Oblast
Association football clubs established in 2008
2008 establishments in Ukraine
Ukrainian reserve football teams